TRCC can refer to:
Three Rivers Community College
Texas Residential Construction Commission